Blackmailed is a 1951 British drama film directed by Marc Allégret and starring Mai Zetterling, Dirk Bogarde, Fay Compton and Robert Flemyng. It was adapted from a novel by Elizabeth Myers.

Cast
 Mai Zetterling as Carol Edwards
 Dirk Bogarde as Stephen Mundy
 Fay Compton  as Mrs Christopher
 Robert Flemyng as Doctor Freeman
 Michael Gough as Maurice Edwards
 James Robertson Justice as Mr Sine
 Joan Rice as Alma
 Harold Huth as Hugh Sainsbury
 Wilfrid Hyde-White as Lord Dearsley
 Nora Gordon as Housekeeper
 Cyril Chamberlain as Police Constable
 Charles Saynor as Police Constable
 Derrick Penley as Patrick
 Peter Owen as Chief Printer
 Dennis Brian as Sub-Editor
 Arthur Hambling as Inspector Canin
 Shirley Wright as Mary
 Bruce Seton as Superintendent Crowe
 Marianne Stone as Maggie
 Helen Goss as Matron
 Constance Smith as Nurse Anne
 Edie Martin as Mrs. Porritt
 John Horsley as Maggie's Doctor
 Ballard Berkeley as Dr. McCormick

References

Bibliography
 Spicer, Andrew. Historical Dictionary of Film Noir. Scarecrow Press, 2010.

External links

1951 films
British drama films
1951 drama films
Films directed by Marc Allégret
British black-and-white films
Films shot at Pinewood Studios
1950s English-language films
1950s British films
Films set in London
Films based on British novels